F.I.T. may refer to:

Organizations
 Fashion Institute of Technology
 Florida Institute of Technology
 Free Institute of Trainee
Footscray Institute of Technology (Melbourne Australia)